This is a list of the National Register of Historic Places listings in Jackson County, Texas.

This is intended to be a complete list of properties listed on the National Register of Historic Places in Jackson County, Texas. There are four properties listed on the National Register in the county. One property is also a Recorded Texas Historic Landmark.

Current listings

The publicly disclosed locations of National Register properties may be seen in a mapping service provided.

|}

See also

National Register of Historic Places listings in Texas
Recorded Texas Historic Landmarks in Jackson County

References

External links

Jackson County, Texas
Jackson County
Buildings and structures in Jackson County, Texas